Eleanor Young may refer to:
 Eleanor Anne Young, Catholic religious sister, research scientist, and educator
 Eleanor Winthrop Young, British climber
 Eleanor Young (Crazy Rich Asians), a character from the film Crazy Rich Asians
 Eleanor Young Love, née Young, African-American librarian